Ensemble Offspring is an Australian music ensemble. The group is led by artistic director Claire Edwardes, and features some of Australia's most innovative performers. The group has toured to locations such as Hong Kong, London and Warsaw, are regularly featured at MONA FOMA, Sydney and Melbourne Festivals, and have a cult following at their Sizzle series at Petersham Bowling Club. Ensemble Offspring has premiered over 200 works in its 23-year history. The ensemble was previously known as Spring Ensemble.

Together with Kamil Ellis it was nominated for the 2019 ARIA Award for Best Children's Album for Classic Kids: Music For The Dreaming.

Members
Claire Edwardes (percussion)
Geoffrey Gartner (percussion)
Jason Noble (clarinet)
Lamorna Nightingale (flute)
Veronique Serret (violin)
Zubin Kanga (piano)
Bree van Reyk (drums, percussion)
Blair Harris (cello)

Former members
Damien Ricketson - composer, co-founder and co-artistic director (1995-2015)

Discography

Albums

Awards and nominations

ARIA Music Awards
The ARIA Music Awards is an annual awards ceremony that recognises excellence, innovation, and achievement across all genres of Australian music.

|-
| ARIA Music Awards of 2019
| Classic Kids: Music for the Dreaming 
| ARIA Award for Best Children's Album
| 
|-

National Live Music Awards
The National Live Music Awards (NLMAs) are a broad recognition of Australia's diverse live industry, celebrating the success of the Australian live scene. The awards commenced in 2016.

|-
| National Live Music Awards of 2019
| Ensemble Offspring
| Live Classical Act of the Year
| 
|-

Sidney Myer Performing Arts Group Award
The Sidney Myer Performing Arts Awards (created in 1984) recognise the essential role of arts and culture in affirming our sense of belonging and lifting our community spirit as a nation.

|-
| Sidney Myer Performing Arts Award for 2020
| Ensemble Offspring
| Performing Arts Group Award
| 
|-

References

External links

Australian musical groups